The Pine Bluff Observatory (PBO) is an astronomical observatory located in the town of Cross Plains, Wisconsin (USA) about  west of Madison.  PBO is owned and operated by the University of Wisconsin–Madison (UW-Madison).  It opened in 1958, and is mainly used by students and faculty of UW-Madison for instruction and research.  PBO also provides a facility for testing new instruments.  Recent research conducted at PBO includes measuring the lunar sodium tail, monitoring circumstellar disks around Be stars, and studying the warm ionized medium.

See also
 Washburn Observatory
 List of astronomical observatories

References

External links
 Department of Astronomy at University of Wisconsin–Madison
 Pine Bluff Observatory Clear Sky Clock Forecasts of observing conditions.

Astronomical observatories in Wisconsin
University of Wisconsin–Madison
Buildings and structures in Dane County, Wisconsin